is the 7th album by the Japanese girl idol group Cute. It was released on February 8, 2012 in Japan on the record label Zetima.

The album contains three previously released singles: "Momoiro Sparkling", "Sekaiichi Happy na Onna no Ko", and "Amazuppai Haru ni Sakura Saku", the latter recorded in collaboration with Berryz Kobo. There also three solo tracks, performed by Mai Hagiwara, Chisato Okai, and Saki Nakajima.

The album debuted at number 8 in the Oricon Daily Albums Chart.

Track listing 

Notes
 The original version of "Seishun Gekijō", performed by Berryz Kobo×C-ute, was released on the Hello! Project compilation album Petit Best 12.

Notes
 Tracks 2–6 were recorded at Berryz Kobo & C-ute Collabo Concert Tour 2011 Aki 'Berikyū Island'

Charts

References

External links 
 Tsunku's comments on the album 
 Profile on the Up-Front Works official website 
 Profile on the Hello! Project official website 
 Limited Edition, profile on the Oricon website 
 Regular Edition, profile on the Oricon website 

2012 albums
Cute (Japanese idol group) albums
Zetima albums